Lisie Jamy may refer to the following places:
Lisie Jamy, Pomeranian Voivodeship (north Poland)
Lisie Jamy, Subcarpathian Voivodeship (south-east Poland)
Lisie Jamy, Świętokrzyskie Voivodeship (south-central Poland)
Lisie Jamy, Warmian-Masurian Voivodeship (north Poland)